General elections were held in Belize on 4 September 1989. The result was a narrow victory for the People's United Party, which won 15 of the 28 seats. Voter turnout was 72.6%.

Background
The ruling United Democratic Party was finishing its first term and sought re-election on the basis of improved economic indicators and standard of living. The People's United Party painted them as lusting after foreign aid and recognition, particularly from the United States and Taiwan.

Another issue was national security; the PUP attacked a CIA-like operation known as the Secret Intelligence Service as being a spy network for the UDP and promised freedom of the press and other fundamental freedoms enshrined in the constitution.

Longtime PUP leader George Cadle Price returned to both the House of Representatives and as prime minister after his surprise ouster in the 1984 election, winning the Pickstock constituency in the Belize District.

Results

By constituency

References

Belize
Legislative election
General elections in Belize
Belize